Germansville is an exurban, unincorporated community which is located in Heidelberg Township in Lehigh County, Pennsylvania. 

It is part of the Lehigh Valley, which has a population of 861,899 and was the 68th most populous metropolitan area in the U.S. as of the 2020 census.

Geography

References

Unincorporated communities in Lehigh County, Pennsylvania
Unincorporated communities in Pennsylvania